Ingeborg Bruhn Bertelsen (26 April 1894 – 26 June 1977) was a Danish actress. She appeared in more than 80 films between 1911 and 1936.

Selected filmography
 Kærlighed og Mobilisering (1915)
 Cirkusrevyen 1936 (1936)

References

External links

1894 births
1977 deaths
Danish stage actresses
Danish silent film actresses
Danish film actresses
Actresses from Copenhagen
Danish emigrants to the United States